Drawn, ground, and polished (DGP) is a classification of finishing processes often used for metal shafting. Cold drawing increases the metal's strength, while grinding and polishing improves the surface finish and roundness for high dimensional accuracy.

See also
 Turned, ground, and polished

References

Metalworking terminology